Nathan Darrow (born ) is an American actor known for his role as Secret Service agent Edward Meechum in House of Cards, John Custer in Preacher, Andrew Madoff in The Wizard of Lies, and as Victor Fries/Mr. Freeze in Gotham.

Early life
Darrow is a native of the Kansas City area. After attending Shawnee Mission North High School in Overland Park, Kansas, he earned his bachelor's degree from University of Evansville and attended graduate school at New York University.

Career
In 2003, Darrow returned to Kansas City, and performed in productions of Shakespeare's plays, including Romeo and Juliet and Henry V. In 2006, he played young William Randolf Hearst in Don Maxwell's Ambrose Bierce: Civil War Stories, which also starred Campbell Scott and Vivian Schilling. A role in a touring production of Richard III with Kevin Spacey led to casting in the role of Meechum, the Underwoods' stoic bodyguard in House of Cards. Darrow's role was expanded in Season Two, as the character of Meechum had been well received by critics and audiences. Darrow appeared as Ben Farrell in The Stolen Chair Theatre Company's film noir for the stage, Kill Me Like You Mean It, at the 4th St Theatre in New York City. He appeared at Princeton's McCarter Theatre in Rachel Bonds' Five Mile Lake, May 1–31, 2015, directed by Emily Mann.

It was announced that Darrow would appear in the second season of the Fox television series Gotham as  Victor Fries/Mr. Freeze.

He has a recurring role in the first season of  Billions, and returns in the third season going onward. He is set to appear in the fourth and final season of Rectify. He also appears as Jesse Custer's father in the AMC television series Preacher and as Jonathan Grimm in the NBC series The Blacklist. He plays Andrew Madoff in HBO's The Wizard of Lies (2017). He starred in the third season of the ABC thriller Quantico as Felix Pillay.

References

External links

1976 births
Living people
People from Overland Park, Kansas
Male actors from Kansas City, Missouri
Male actors from Kansas
American male television actors
American male stage actors
University of Evansville alumni
21st-century American male actors